The Continental IO-346 engine is a fuel-injected four-cylinder aircraft engine that was developed especially for the Beechcraft Musketeer Custom III by Continental Motors. It was produced for that aircraft between 1965 and 1969.

Design and development

There is no carbureted version of the engine, which would have been designated O-346 and therefore the base model is the IO-346.

The IO-346 was designed to run on 91-98 avgas. The engine has a dry weight of 269¾ lb or 297 lb including the generator and starter. The ignition system consists of dual magnetos, one Scintilla S4RN-201 and one S4RN-205 or, alternatively, two Slick Electro 449 magnetos.

Variants

IO-346-A
Base model, certified 27 July 1962
IO-346-B
Identical to IO-346-A except it incorporates provisions for a hydraulic propeller control. Certified 23 June 1964.

Applications

Beechcraft Musketeer
Gadfly E.S 102
Piel Emeraude
Stampe SV-4D

Specifications (IO-346)
Reference: Engines for Homebuilt Aircraft & Ultralights

See also
List of aircraft engines

References

1960s aircraft piston engines
Boxer engines
IO-346